St Denys railway station serves the St Denys and Portswood suburbs of Southampton in Hampshire, England.

Built in 1865, the station is named after the surrounding area, which in turn is named after the Priory of St Denys, a major landmark in medieval Southampton.

The station is at the site of the junction between the South West Main Line and the West Coastway Line running between Southampton and Portsmouth. It is currently served mainly by South Western Railway, with additional services operated by Southern. There are four platforms; two on the main line and two on the branch line.

History

The original station was opened by the London and South Western Railway on 1 May 1861 and named Portswood after the small village to the west of the main line. Shortly after, to accommodate the Portsmouth branch line, a new station building was built  to the south; the relocated station was opened on 5 March 1866. However to avoid confusion with Portsmouth, the station was renamed to St Denys on 1 January 1876.

The station buildings themselves are fine examples of the Victorian Italianate classical style architecture introduced to the LSWR by William Tite. The original 1867 station building on platform 1 is Grade II listed, now privately owned and renamed Drummond House. Platforms 2 and 3 house the waiting room and ticket window, whilst the old station buildings on platform 4 house The Solent Model Railway Group, a local organisation.

Services
Off-peak, all services are operated by South Western Railway. The off-peak service in trains per hour is:
 1 tph to 
 1 tph to 
 1 tph to  via 
 1 tph to  via 

Southern also provide a few services during the peak periods.

Accidents and incidents
In August 1939, a train overran signals and was derailed by trap points. The accident caused a set of points to move, diverting an approaching boat train. This averted a more serious accident, as wreckage was foul of the route the boat train should have taken.
On 14 August 1940, a passenger train hauled by Lord Nelson class locomotive 860 Lord Hawke was derailed due to enemy action. A bomb fell on the line ahead of the train, which was unable to stop in time.
On 29 October 1959, a passenger train overran signals and was derailed by trap points.
On 12 December 1960, a passenger train overran signals and was derailed. Two people were injured.
On 28 February 2022 a scooter was thrown onto the tracks at the station, causing a short circuit with the third rail electrical supply. Eyewitnesses reported that the subsequent electrical arcing caused flames so bright that it "looked like daytime".

References

External links

Local Rail Information

Railway stations in Southampton
DfT Category E stations
Former London and South Western Railway stations
Railway stations in Great Britain opened in 1861
Railway stations in Great Britain closed in 1866
Railway stations in Great Britain opened in 1866
Railway stations served by Govia Thameslink Railway
Railway stations served by South Western Railway
Grade II listed buildings in Hampshire
1861 establishments in England